The Roop (stylised in all caps) are a Lithuanian pop rock band from Vilnius. Formed in 2014, the group consists of lead vocalist Vaidotas Valiukevičius, percussionist Robertas Baranauskas and guitarist Mantas Banišauskas. The group has released three albums – To Whom It May Concern in 2015, Ghosts in 2017 and Concrete Flower in 2022 – as well as the extended play Yes, I Do in 2018. They were due to represent Lithuania in the Eurovision Song Contest 2020 with their song "On Fire" before the contest was cancelled. They then took part in the Eurovision Song Contest 2021 with "Discoteque", finishing in eighth place in the final.

Career

2014-2018: To Whom it May Concern
The band were formed in 2014 and featured Vaidotas Valiukevičius, a former member of the Baltic boybands Kosmo and Omega, who had been recording as Milanno in the 2000s, an act who had released songs such as "Nieko nereikia daugiau". After giving up on Milanno in 2010, Valiukevičius took a break from music until forming The Roop, where he took on a new musical direction with bandmates Robertas Baranauskas and Mantas Banišauskas. In 2015, their debut album To Whom it May Concern was released.

2018–present: Eurovision Song Contest 
The Roop attempted to compete in the Eurovision Song Contest three times. They took part in Lithuania's 2018 national selection with the song "Yes, I Do". In the final, they received 16,491 votes (the second-highest ranking) from the public and came third overall. The Roop returned for the 2020 edition, Pabandom iš naujo! 2020, in the final of which it won both the public vote (with 50,139 votes) and the jury vote. The Roop was thus set to represent Lithuania with "On Fire" at the Eurovision Song Contest 2020 in May that year. The Eurovision Song Contest 2020 was cancelled in March 2020 due to the COVID-19 pandemic. Several countries held alternatives to the contest and ranked the 2020 entries themselves; the Roop won Eurovision 2020 - Das Deutsche Finale, one of the replacing shows. The Lithuanian national broadcaster, Lithuanian National Radio and Television, decided to hold a new national selection for the 2021 contest and guaranteed the Roop a place in the final. The Roop announced their intent to participate again in November 2020. They released their competing song, "Discoteque", in January 2021. The song won the selection, winning the jury vote and surpassing 74,000 televotes in the final, and finished 8th representing Lithuania in the Eurovision Song Contest 2021. The band performed with dancers and choreographers Miglė Praniauskaitė and Marijanas Staniulenas.

Discography

Studio albums

Extended plays

Singles

Awards and nominations

References

External links 
 

2014 establishments in Lithuania
Eurovision Song Contest entrants of 2020
Eurovision Song Contest entrants of 2021
Lithuanian electronic music groups
Eurovision Song Contest entrants for Lithuania
Lithuanian rock music groups
Musical groups established in 2014